is a Japanese manga series written and illustrated by George Akiyama. The series was originally serialized in Shogakukan's shōnen manga magazine Weekly Shōnen Sunday from 1970 to 1971, with its chapters collected into two tankōbon volumes. Shōnen Sunday was once specified as "harmful" in some prefectures when the series has started, because of its violent and drastic depiction.

The story was about a boy named  who lived in extreme poverty, who gained affluence and influence through a series of murders.
Zeni means money in Japanese and Geba means die Gewalt (power) in German, so the title can be translated into "Moneypower".

A film of Zeni Geba was released in 1970, directed by Yoshinori Wada, starring Jūrō Kara and Mako Midori, and featuring an appearance by science fiction author Izumi Suzuki.
The series was dramatized into a TV series in 2009, and was aired from January to March by the NNN TVs in Japan, starring Kenichi Matsuyama. The original story was released shortly after when Student activism was on in Japan and thus reflected such historical backgrounds as represented in its use of the word  in the title. The background of the TV series, on the other hand, was adjusted to reflect the 2009 world, including positioning of the main character as  working at a factory.

References

External links

External links
 Official NTV website 
 Zenigeba at IMDb

Japanese drama television series
1970 manga
Shōnen manga
Television shows written by Yoshikazu Okada
Nippon TV dramas